Hunting, Wisconsin is a former unincorporated community of Shawano and Waupaca Counties, located in the towns of Belle Plaine and Matteson, along the north shore of the Embarrass River, United States. Today little more remains of the community than the name of the road that traverses it: "Hunting Road."

History
A post office called Hunting was established in 1880, and remained in operation until it was discontinued in 1934. The community may have been named either in honor of a landowner named Hunting, or from the fact the area was a hunting ground, or both.

Notes

Unincorporated communities in Wisconsin
Unincorporated communities in Shawano County, Wisconsin
Unincorporated communities in Waupaca County, Wisconsin